Gilboa is a village in Putnam County, Ohio, United States. The village is named after Mount Gilboa. The population was 184 at the 2010 census.

Geography
Gilboa is located at  (41.017329, -83.921143).

Demographics

2010 census
As of the census of 2010, there were 184 people, 71 households, and 50 families living in the village. The racial makeup of the village was 94.6% White, 0.5% Asian, 3.8% from other races, and 1.1% from two or more races. Hispanic or Latino of any race were 9.2% of the population.

There were 71 households, of which 35.2% had children under the age of 18 living with them, 57.7% were married couples living together, 5.6% had a female householder with no husband present, 7.0% had a male householder with no wife present, and 29.6% were non-families. 28.2% of all households were made up of individuals, and 12.7% had someone living alone who was 65 years of age or older. The average household size was 2.59 and the average family size was 3.18.

The median age in the village was 34 years. 25.5% of residents were under the age of 18; 8.7% were between the ages of 18 and 24; 24.4% were from 25 to 44; 22.3% were from 45 to 64; and 19% were 65 years of age or older. The gender makeup of the village was 49.5% male and 50.5% female.

2000 census
As of the census of 2000, there were 170 people, 72 households, and 43 families living in the village. The population density was 1,139.3 people per square mile (437.6/km2). There were 78 housing units at an average density of 522.8 per square mile (200.8/km2). The racial makeup of the village was 98.24% White, 0.59% from other races, and 1.18% from two or more races. Hispanic or Latino of any race were 0.59% of the population.

There were 72 households, out of which 29.2% had children under the age of 18 living with them, 47.2% were married couples living together, 8.3% had a female householder with no husband present, and 38.9% were non-families. 33.3% of all households were made up of individuals, and 12.5% had someone living alone who was 65 years of age or older. The average household size was 2.36 and the average family size was 3.05.

In the village, the population was spread out, with 26.5% under the age of 18, 4.1% from 18 to 24, 34.1% from 25 to 44, 20.6% from 45 to 64, and 14.7% who were 65 years of age or older. The median age was 36 years. For every 100 females there were 112.5 males. For every 100 females age 18 and over, there were 104.9 males.

The median income for a household in the village was $29,844, and the median income for a family was $31,250. Males had a median income of $29,286 versus $22,045 for females. The per capita income for the village was $15,535. None of the families and 5.2% of the population were living below the poverty line, including no under eighteens and 11.5% of those over 64.

School
Pandora-Gilboa is the school district many students from Gilboa attend, although some attend Ottawa-Glandorf.

History
Gilboa was laid out in 1837. The village was incorporated in 1848. A post office was established at Gilboa in 1843, and remained in operation until 1985.

On August 6, 1852, a cholera epidemic struck Gilboa. The start of the epidemic was traced to a large damp cellar that had been used to store trash and decomposing waste. The epidemic lasted until August 21 and killed 13 Gilboa residents including one of the two doctors that had not fled. Out of the estimated 600 population, all but 40 fled including four of Gilboa's six doctors.

Mayors
1909 - D. R. Oren (term expired 1910)

Gilboa post masters
1851 - Lyman W Moe
1855 - John E Creighton
1857 - Jerome Youngkin
1859 - Jerome Youngkin

Notable natives
Edward S. Matthias was an Ohio Supreme Court justice from 1914 until his death in 1953. Having served 38 years, he was the longest serving justice of the court.
Dr. Charles H. Spencer D.O., a pioneer of modern Osteopathic Medicine.

Notable Attractions 

 Bigbeefcow

References

External links
 Gilboa Police Department

Villages in Putnam County, Ohio
Villages in Ohio